Seip is a surname. Notable people with the surname include:

Andreas Martin Seip (1790–1850), Norwegian military officer and politician
Anne-Lise Seip (born 1933), Norwegian historian and former politician
Didrik Arup Seip (1884-1963), Norwegian professor of northern Germanic languages
Hans Kristian Seip (1881-1945), Norwegian engineer and politician
Hans Kristian Seip (forester) (born 1920), Norwegian professor and politician
Hans Martin Seip (born 1937), Norwegian chemist
Helge Seip (1919-2004), Norwegian politician
Jens Arup Seip (1905-1992), Norwegian historian, husband of Anne-Lise Seip
Karl Seip (1850-1909), Norwegian priest, educator, and briefly Minister of Education and Church Affairs
Kristian Seip (born 1962), Norwegian mathematician
Marcel Seip (born 1982), Dutch footballer
Tim Seip (born 1969), American politician

See also
Seip mountain, Norway, named after Karl Seip
Seip House, in Chillicothe, Ohio, on the National Register of Historic Places
Search engine image protection, designed to protect a company or brand against negative publicity
Seipsville Hotel, also known as Seip's Hotel or Seip's Tavern